Havakazoo is a British pre-school series which aired on Channel 5's Milkshake strand. It was the first original children's program to air when it launched in 1997.

Set up
Originally Havakazoo was created as a flagship show for channel 5's strand for children, 'Milkshake!'. It was the first original show to air in 1997 when the channel launched. The shows main character was a robot style spin dryer called 'messy'. Each programme was presented by Gabrielle Bradshaw and Jason Maverick and followed a broad theme that consisted of songs, stories and activities with the two main presenters in the studio. A short clip from the outside world was introduced into each show. The presenters would frequently invite the younger viewers to participate at home by showing them how to make something. They signed off at the end of episodes by each saying, "Havakazoo".

The series aired weekday mornings. A half-hour episode also aired on weekends with the character Messy acting as a mascot introducing a selection of shows from the strand, telling jokes, questions, and showing a picture of any Havakazoo or non-Havakazoo characters that was drawn by a child with Vo playing with his guitar at a background in each links, This was later dropped in series two when the sister show Tickle, Patch and Friends was introduced.

From the second series the show centres around a puppet dog called 'Watch Dog'. Messy was reintroduced with the format staying almost the same. A segment showing a cartoon style camcorder called 'Nosey' was introduced to show clips from the outside world. Nosey later became a separate show altogether.

From series Three the show was revamped. Many changes were made. Each episode now centres on the characters 'Patrica' and 'Patrick'. Played by Naomi Wilkinson and Andy Ford. Two bakers who lived inside the windmill and both also acted as presenters. All of the characters from the second series returned and new were also introduced. Songs, games, poems and stories, as well as regular craft activities still featured throughout. However, the show created a more comedy aspect to its overall feel. Two new Characters were also added. A female dog, Watchdog's younger niece called 'Plum' and the fleas 'Tick and Tock' who lived inside Watch Dog's fur, without his knowledge.

Gabrielle Bradshaw and Jason Maverick presented as themselves for the first two series. From 1999, Milkshake! Presenter, Naomi Wilkinson was introduced as "Patrica" and comedian and pantomime actor Andy Ford as Patrick the baker. Vo Fletcher appeared regularly with his guitar in series One having also written the title music for the show. 

All puppets were created by Hands Up Puppets.

Characters
• Messy
A robot like spin dryer made out of unused things. Voiced by Joe Grecco.

• Watchdog (Series 2-)
A dog who would often keep an eye on the time and a look out from the window. Seen from series 2.

• Tick and Tock (Series 3–)
Two fleas who lived inside watchdogs hair and told jokes. Seen from series 3 onwards.

• Vo Fletcher (Series 1)
Played himself. An artist who performed songs.

• Gabrielle,
Presenter, herself (Series 1–2)

• Jason,
Presenter, himself (Series 1–2)

• Plum (Series 3–) 
Watchdogs Niece. A young female dog who delivers bread made in the windmill

• Patrica (Series 3–)
Works at the windmill. Also acts a presenter. Played by Naomi Wilkinson.

• Patrick (Series 3–)
Works at the windmill as a baker. Also acts a presenter. Played by Andy Ford.

References

External links

Channel 5 (British TV channel) original programming
1997 British television series debuts
2002 British television series endings
1990s British children's television series
2000s British children's television series
British television shows featuring puppetry
Television programming blocks in Europe
Breakfast television in the United Kingdom
British preschool education television series
English-language television shows